This is a list of events held and scheduled by King of the Cage (KOTC), a mixed martial arts organization based primarily in the United States, but which holds branded events worldwide. The first event, Bas Rutten's King of the Cage, took place on October 30, 1999. All events are confirmed by Sherdog.

Scheduled events

Past events

See also
 King of the Cage
 List of King of the Cage champions

External links 
 King of the Cage official website
KOTC event results at Sherdog

KOTC
Mixed martial arts in the United States
KOTC
King of the Cage events

fr:King of the Cage
ja:King of the Cage